is a Japanese publisher founded on September 10, 1971  and based in Shinjuku, Tokyo which specializes in hentai manga magazines.

Comic Kairakuten 

, published by WANIMAGAZINE CO., LTD, Is Japan’s biggest selling ero (hentai) manga monthly magazine. First published in Japan in 1995, Comic Kairakuten started as a monthly comic which contained some hentai manga alongside other genres but slowly evolved into a magazine which consisted predominantly of hentai manga.

Comic Kairakuten is currently available to purchase in Japanese convenience stores, and digital versions of the magazine became available in 2014. Comic Kairakuten is published on the 29th of the month unless the 29th is a Sunday or a public holiday, in which case it may be published between the 27th to the 30th of the month.

Notable Contributors 
Over the years the magazine featured many famous illustrators and manga artists including LINDA, Keito Koume, Hanaharu Naruco, Napata, Key, Michiking and Homunculus. Many of the early covers were drawn by Murata Range, who still draws a monthly illustration for the magazine in a feature named futuregraph.

International distribution 
In 2015, an English language version of Comic Kairakuten and its slightly harder spin off X-EROS began being published outside of Japan by FAKKU, the largest English-language hentai publisher in the world. They were the first monthly eromanga magazines to be officially published in English. The English version is released on the same day as the Japanese original, also making them the first monthly eromanga magazines to be simulpublished in a language other than Japanese. 

The Japanese language version of the magazine is currently also available in Hong Kong, Taiwan, Singapore, and Malaysia via the eromanga magazine streaming platform Komiflo.

Magazines

Manga

Comic X-Eros 

Wani-Bites (English-language; iBooks; since 2014)

Gravure

Yha! Hip&Lip

References

External links

 Official streaming site (Japanese)
 Official hentai streaming site (English)

1971 establishments in Japan
Comic book publishing companies in Tokyo
Manga distributors
Publishing companies established in 1971
Hentai companies